The American School of Kuwait (also known as ASK) is a K-12 private school institution which also includes a pre-school (referred to as the Child Development Center). It is located in Hawalli, Kuwait.

History
In 1963, a group of American parents began the process of forming a new international school in Kuwait. This new school's first term began in September, 1964, in the Dasman Area of Sharq, Kuwait, and was known as the International School of Kuwait.

In 1969, the ASK Campus separated into two campuses, with one in Salwa and one in Surra. The Salwa campus contained the Elementary school, while the Surra campus contained both the Middle and High Schools. The school received its initial US accreditation from the Middle States Association in 1971, and has been receiving it continuously since then.

The school was closed for the 1990 to 1991 school term, due to the events of the invasion of Kuwait. The school reopened in the fall of 1991.

Over the summer of 1994, both ASK campuses, the Surra and Salwa campuses, moved again to a new campus located in the Hawalli area. This reunited the elementary, middle, and high school students once again in one campus for the start of the 1994 to 1995 school term. The school has been at this location ever since.

Present day

Administration
Mr. Michael Murphy is the current superintendent of the school. The principals of each of the schools are Ms. Monique Livsey (high school), Mrs. Kristi Fowler (middle school), and Dr. Steve Caley (elementary school).

Faculty
The school currently has 183 full-time faculty members, including 88 American nationals, 35 Canadian citizens, and 60 teachers representing 14 other nationalities.

Student body
The School currently (as of September, 2018) has approximately 2,101 students total.  Approximately 20% of the students are US citizens, 54% are locals, and the remaining 26% represent 65 other nationalities.  Pre-K and elementary have 1012 students, the middle school has 471 students, and the high school has 618 students; there are 144 seniors, 151 juniors, 160 sophomores, and 163 freshmen.

Campus and facilities
The school possesses one of the largest campuses in Kuwait. The campus now houses 145 classrooms, which include eight computer labs, four music rooms, four art rooms, ten science labs, two large library/media centers, two gymnasiums, a fitness center and weight room, an indoor 25-meter pool, a large multi-purpose auditorium, and three large outdoor play areas.

Curriculum
The curriculum is similar to that of US general academic and college preparatory schools.  The school's testing programs include the SAT, PSAT, Plan, Explore, ACT and the MAPS.  The language of instruction is English.  French and Spanish are taught as foreign languages.  Religious instruction is required for Muslims, as is Arabic for all students (students who hold passports from Arab countries take Arabic language courses through graduation, while holders of passports from non-Arab countries take Arabic-As-a-Second-Language courses until grade 11).

The elementary program, in which teachers are organized into grade-level teams, features specialists in science, art, computer studies, music, drama, physical education, Arabic, and Islamic Studies. The middle school, which includes sixth through eighth grades, utilizes interdisciplinary teams and a curriculum based on a block schedule. The high school, which currently offers seventeen AP courses, is constantly re-evaluating its programs to better serve the needs and interests of students.

The American School of Kuwait is also one of the first schools worldwide to offer the AP Capstone Diploma program.

See also

 List of schools in Kuwait
 List of international schools

Footnotes

External links
US Office of Overseas Schools report
Review from the Good Schools Guide International

American international schools in Kuwait
Educational institutions established in 1964
1964 establishments in Kuwait
Private schools in Kuwait